Nathon Irvin (born 31 January 1973) is a former Australian rules footballer who played with the Sydney Swans in the Australian Football League (AFL).

Irvin came to Sydney from Mangoplah, near Wagga Wagga. A defender, he played just one senior AFL game for the Swans, against Hawthorn in round two of the 1993 AFL season. In the 1994 National Draft he was secured by Footscray, but he would not make any league appearances for the club.

He played for three South Australian National Football League clubs, first Norwood, followed by Sturt and then Glenelg. In 2003 he joined the Wagga Tigers, which he would both captain and coach from 2003 to 2005. 

Irvin later coached Mangoplah from 2012 to 2014 and again in 2016.

References

External links
 
 

1973 births
Living people
Australian rules footballers from New South Wales
Sydney Swans players
Norwood Football Club players
Sturt Football Club players
Glenelg Football Club players